Ted Barela is an American Republican politician formerly serving in the New Mexico Senate. He was appointed by Governor Susana Martinez in 2015 to replace Phil Griego, who resigned. Barela previously served as mayor of Estancia, New Mexico, from 2008 until 2013.

Personal life
Barela and his wife, Janice, have three children: Jonathan, Alyssa, and Sharalynn; and six grandchildren: Quintin, Abigail, JC, Hattie, Gracelynn and Zander.

References

Year of birth missing (living people)
Republican Party New Mexico state senators
Mayors of places in New Mexico
People from Torrance County, New Mexico
21st-century American politicians
Hispanic and Latino American mayors
Hispanic and Latino American state legislators in New Mexico
Living people